Mohsen Irannejad (Persian: محسن ایرانژاد; born July 15, 1985) is an Iranian footballer who is a member of Arman Gohar Sirjan Club in the Azadegan League of Iran.

Club career
Irannezhad joined Shahin Bushehr in 2009 after spending the previous two seasons at Gol Gohar. He was signed a three-year contract with Sepahan on 2 June 2012. He was loaned to another Isfahani based side, Zob Ahan in December 2013. After the end of the season, he was released by Sepahan.

On 1 July 2014, Irannejad joined Rah Ahan with a two-year contract.

Club career statistics

 Assists

Honours

Club
Hazfi Cup
Winner: 1
2012–13 with Sepahan
Runner up: 1
2011–12 with Shahin Bushehr

References

External links

Mohsen irannejad  on instagram

1985 births
Living people
Shahin Bushehr F.C. players
Gol Gohar players
Iranian footballers
Association football fullbacks